The 36th Indian Infantry Division was an infantry division of the Indian Army during the Second World War. The division was subsequently redesignated as a British Army formation, the 36th Infantry Division in September 1944. It served in India and during the Burma Campaign. After the end of the war it was disbanded and its remaining British units were transferred to the British 2nd Infantry Division.

History

36th Indian Division
The division was formed in India on 15 December 1942. Its constituent formations were the 29th Infantry Brigade Group (under command from 26 January 1943), which had already fought as an independent brigade in the Battle of Madagascar, and 72nd Indian Infantry Brigade confusingly composed of entirely British combat units.  72nd Indian Infantry Brigade was re-designated the new 72nd Infantry Brigade (the previous 72 Inf Bde had become 5th Parachute Brigade on 28 April 1943). Most of the division's engineer, medical and service units were Indian. The division's formation sign was two interlinked rings, one white and one red, on a black square background.

In January 1943, Brigadier Francis Festing was promoted from command of the 29th Brigade to that of the division. (His replacement as commander of 29th Brigade was Brigadier Hugh Stockwell.) Parts of the division were present in the First Arakan campaign in early 1943. It was intended that part of the division was to launch an amphibious assault on Akyab Island, but this operation was cancelled.

The division was initially in reserve for the Second Arakan campaign in early 1944, but was called on to relieve the besieged 7th Indian infantry Division after early setbacks. After the Japanese were defeated at the Battle of Ngakyedauk, 7th Division was withdrawn and 36th Division took over the offensive in the Kalapanzin River Valley. Units of the division captured the vital eastern railway tunnel linking the Kalapanzin valley with the port of Maungdaw.

The division withdrew for a brief rest at Shillong in Assam, and was then despatched to Ledo, where it came under command of the American-led Northern Combat Area Command.

36th Infantry Division

Early in July 1944, the division started to fly into Myitkyina airfield in North Burma, with 72nd Brigade being the first formation to land. On 1 September 1944, shortly after the division had started advancing down the "Railway valley" from Mogaung towards Indaw on the right flank of NCAC, the division was renamed the British 36th Division. On 14 December, a third brigade was added to the division; confusingly, this was the first Indian formation that the division commanded (the 26th Indian Infantry Brigade, of one British and two Indian battalions).

The division was distinguished for being the only British division to rely entirely on air supply, mainly by the United States' Tenth Air Force, for an extended period. The United States Army Air Force also provided the division with 12 light aircraft equipped for casualty evacuation and a US Army engineer company to construct its airstrips. Initially, the division was without its own divisional artillery and instead relied on a Chinese artillery group under US command.

The division, having linked up with the main body of Lieutenant General William "Bill" Slim's British Fourteenth Army, crossed the Irrawaddy River and advanced independently down the eastern side of the river. Units from the division suffered losses forcing the crossing the 300 yard wide Shweli River, but the division continued to advance until the fall of Mandalay in March 1945. On 1 April 1945 the division transferred from NCAC to Fourteenth Army. The 26th Indian Brigade became the 26th British Brigade on 6 April.

As there were now more troops in Burma than could be supplied (and the transport aircraft allocated to NCAC were being withdrawn to China), the division was returned to India, officially arriving on 12 May, and joined XXXIV Corps (India) on 28 May.

Order of battle

References

Sources

Further reading
 Joslen, HF,  (1960) Orders of Battle Volume 1 United Kingdom and Colonial Formations and Units in the Second World War 1939–1945, London, HMSO 1960

External links
 Unit Histories
 British Military History - Indian Divisional Histories

Infantry divisions of the British Army in World War II
Indian World War II divisions
Divisions of the Indian Army
British Indian Army divisions
Military units and formations established in 1944
Military units and formations of the British Empire in World War II
D
Military units and formations disestablished in 1945